Kelley Maureen O'Hara (born August 4, 1988) is an American soccer player, two-time FIFA Women's World Cup champion, and Olympic gold medalist. She currently plays as a defender for the Gotham FC in the National Women's Soccer League (NWSL) and the United States women's national soccer team. She previously played professionally for FC Gold Pride, Boston Breakers, Sky Blue FC, Utah Royals FC and Washington Spirit.

O'Hara was the 2009 recipient of the  Hermann Trophy while playing for the Stanford Cardinal women's soccer team. She competed in the 2011, 2015, and 2019 FIFA Women's World Cups, and was one of three players for the U.S. that played every minute in the 2012 Olympics women's football tournament where the team won gold.

She is the host of the Just Women's Sports podcast.

Early life 
O'Hara was born in Fayetteville, Georgia, near Atlanta to parents Dan and Karen O'Hara. She has a brother named Jerry and a sister named Erin. O'Hara has Irish heritage. O'Hara grew up in Peachtree City, Georgia and graduated from Starr's Mill High School in Fayette County where she played four years on the varsity soccer team and captained the team during her junior and senior years. O'Hara helped lead the Panthers to the 5A state title in 2006 with 20 goals and 16 assists. The team finished second in the state championships during her sophomore year. O'Hara was named Parade All-American as a junior and a senior and All-League, All-County and All-State all four years. In 2006, she was named the 2006 Atlanta Journal-Constitution (AJC) Player of the Year and Gatorade Georgia State Player of the Year. She was also named NSCAA All-American.

O'Hara played for club teams, the Peachtree City Lazers and AFC Lightning before playing for the U.S. U-16s in 2004 and then joining the U-17 youth women's national team of that same year. She played on the Concorde Fire South '88 Elite that went on to win the 2007 GA U19G State Cup and advance to the Semi Finals of Regionals.

Stanford Cardinal (2006–2009) 
A two-time Parade All-American coming into her freshman year at Stanford University, O'Hara led the Cardinal in scoring in 2006 with nine goals. She repeated that feat during her sophomore year, helping the Cardinal to the third round of the NCAA Tournament.

During O'Hara's junior year, Stanford advanced to the College Cup for the first time since 1993, defeating 2005 national champion Portland, 1–0. The Cardinal would fall in the semi-final, 0–1, to Notre Dame.

As a senior, she had one of the best seasons in Division I history, scoring 26 goals with 13 assists. O'Hara's senior year ended in the 2009 College Cup, where the Cardinal lost to North Carolina. O'Hara received two yellow cards in the second half, ejecting her from the game, forcing the Cardinal to finish the game a woman down. The game ended with a score of 1–0, thus marking North Carolina's twentieth National Championship. She finished her college career at Stanford with 57 goals and 32 assists, both school records at the time.

O'Hara was awarded the 2009 Hermann Trophy as collegiate soccer's top player. She had been on the MAC Hermann Trophy watch list for three consecutive seasons. O'Hara was also a member of the Kappa Kappa Gamma sorority during her time at Stanford.

Club career
Prior to graduating from Stanford, O'Hara played for the Pali Blues of the USL W-League (semi-pro) in the summer of 2009, scoring four goals during her tenure with the club.

WPS: FC Gold Pride, Boston Breakers (2010–2011) 

O'Hara was drafted third overall by FC Gold Pride at the 2010 WPS Draft. In addition to the close proximity of home stadium Pioneer Stadium to O'Hara's alma mater Stanford University, O'Hara had previously worked with FC Gold Pride head coach Albertin Montoya when he served as an assistant coach at Stanford University in 2008.

The team dominated the season finishing first during the regular season after defeating the Philadelphia Independence 4–1 with goals from O'Hara, Christine Sinclair and Marta. As the regular season champion, the team earned a direct route to the championship playoff game where they faced the Philadelphia Independence. During the final, FC Gold Pride defeated the Independence 4–0 to clinch the WPS Championship. Despite their successful season, the club ceased operations on November 16, 2010, due to not meeting the league's financial reserve requirement.

After FC Gold Pride folded in November 2010, O'Hara was signed by the Boston Breakers. She scored 10 goals during her two seasons in the WPS playing primarily as an outside midfielder. On January 5, 2012, it was announced O'Hara would be going back to her hometown because she had signed with the Atlanta Beat. However, the league folded just before the 2012 season began.

NWSL: Sky Blue FC, 2013–2017 
On January 11, 2013, O'Hara joined Sky Blue FC in the new National Women's Soccer League. Because the club's head coach, Jim Gabarra, played O'Hara as a forward, she reverted to a role she filled with success in college.

Over her career at Sky Blue, O'Hara has been played in several roles including forward, winger, right-back, and central midfielder.

Utah Royals FC, 2017–2020
On December 29, 2017, O'Hara was traded to Utah Royals FC. Due to a hamstring injury, O'Hara only appeared in 8 games for Utah in 2018. O'Hara contributed to Utah's first-ever franchise win, scoring a goal in the team's 2–0 victory over the Washington Spirit in May 2018.

Utah finished the season in 5th place, just 2 points shy of making the playoffs. O'Hara underwent ankle surgery after the 2018 season.

In 2019, she made only 2 starts in 4 appearances for Utah due to injuries and World Cup duties.
She was still recuperating from an off-season ankle injury at the start of the NWSL season and saw limited minutes as a substitute in two late-April games. Following her World Cup win, O'Hara started in two games for Utah at the end of July, notching an assist in the team's 2–2 draw against Portland. She was named to the 2019 NWSL second XI.

O'Hara played only 65 minutes for the Royals in the abbreviated 2020 NWSL season. She was still recovering from an injury at the start of the Challenge Cup and did not dress for the first few games. She saw limited minutes in Utah's July 13 game against Chicago and the July 18 game against Houston.

Starting in August 2020, rumors of a O'Hara trade to the Washington Spirit began to circulate and O'Hara announced in August that she would opt out of the 2020 NWSL Fall Series, set to begin in early September.

Washington Spirit, 2021–2022
O'Hara's trade to the Spirit was officially announced on December 2, 2020. The deal sent $75,000 in allocation money to the Utah Royals and a 2022 first round draft pick. The Spirit won their first NWSL Championship on Saturday November 20, 2021, when they defeated the Chicago Red Stars, 2–1 in extra-time at Lynnn Family Stadium in Louisville, Kentucky. O'Hara scored in the 97th minute to seal the victory.

NJ/NY Gotham FC, 2023–present 
On January 25, 2023, O'Hara signed with NJ/NY Gotham FC.

Club summary

Notes

International career

Youth national teams (2005–2010) 

O'Hara represented the United States in various youth national teams from 2005 through 2010. She scored 24 goals in her 35 under-20 caps, the third-most ever for a U.S. player in the U-20 age group. She was a member of the fourth-place United States U-20 women's national soccer team that competed in the 2006 FIFA U-20 Women's World Championship in Russia. O'Hara scored two goals in the tournament: one against the Congo (for which game she was named FIFA's player of the match) and one against Germany. She was also the first player in the tournament to be ejected from a game, having picked up two yellow cards in the game against Argentina.

O'Hara rejoined the U-20 national team at the 2007 Pan American Games. She scored four goals in the women's football tournament, against Paraguay, Panama, and Mexico. The United States, which only sent their U-20 women to the tournament, would fall in the final game, 0–5, to a full-strength Brazilian senior team featuring Brazilian powerhouse, Marta.

In February 2008, O'Hara returned to the U-20 women's national team to play in the U-20 Four Nations Tournament in Chile. Her last appearance for the U-20 team occurred in July 2008, at the 2008 CONCACAF Women's U-20 Championship in Puebla, Mexico. O'Hara helped the U-20 team qualify for the 2008 FIFA U-20 Women's World Cup in Chile. She did not play in the U-20 World Cup, instead remaining with her college team in its NCAA postseason campaign.

Senior national team (2008–present) 
She was called into the senior national team's training camp in December 2009 and attended the January 2010 training camp in the lead-up to the 2010 Algarve Cup. O'Hara earned her first senior national team cap in March 2010, coming in as a substitute during a friendly match against Mexico.

2011 FIFA Women's World Cup 
After falling short of making the 21 player World Cup roster, O'Hara was called up to replace Lindsay Tarpley who tore her ACL in a send-off match against Japan on May 14, 2011. O'Hara earned just one cap at right midfield in the 2011 FIFA Women's World Cup in the final group stage game against Sweden. The United States went on to win the silver medal in that tournament.

2012 Olympics 
Throughout her national U-20s, collegiate, and club career, O'Hara was one of the top young offensive players in the United States, but under head coach Pia Sundhage, O'Hara was converted to play outside back in 2012 after teammate Ali Krieger went down with an ACL injury in the 2012 CONCACAF Women's Olympic Qualifying Tournament. Against Guatemala on January 22, 2012, in the Olympic Qualifiers, she made her first start at left back and registered three assists. O'Hara made her first start at right back against Costa Rica in the match that qualified the United States for the 2012 Summer Olympics in London.
O'Hara played in every minute of the United States' gold medal run, one of three American players to do so.

2015 FIFA Women's World Cup 
In the United States' first four games of the 2015 FIFA Women's World Cup, O'Hara did not see any playing time. O'Hara made her first start of the tournament in the quarter-final game against China PR. She was replaced by Christen Press in the 61st minute. O'Hara scored her first career international goal in the United States' 2–0 victory over Germany in the semi-final. In the final against Japan, O'Hara entered the game in the 61st minute to replace Megan Rapinoe. The United States went on to defeat Japan 5–2, winning the first World Cup title since 1999 and the third overall World Cup title for the United States since the inaugural Women's World Cup in 1991.

2019 FIFA Women's World Cup 
Despite injuries which kept her from playing regularly for the United States in the year leading up to the World Cup, O'Hara was named to Jill Ellis' roster for the 2019 FIFA World Cup in France. She played in five of the United States' seven games and appeared in all knockout stage games. 
In the team's opening game
against Thailand, O'Hara crossed the ball to Alex Morgan in the 12th minute who converted O'Hara's service to notch the team's first goal of the tournament. The U.S. went on to beat Thailand 13–0. O'Hara made her second assist of the tournament in the semifinal against England when she delivered a cross from the right flank to Christen Press whose 10th minute goal put the U.S. in the lead.
O'Hara started in the final against the Netherlands but was substituted at halftime due to a collision just before the break with the Dutch winger Lieke Martens. The U.S. won the match 2–0 and O'Hara won her second World Cup.

International goals

World Cup and Olympic appearances

Endorsements 
O'Hara has appeared in multiple commercials and advertisements for Under Armour. In 2015, she appeared in television commercials and promotional materials promoting chocolate milk on behalf of the National Fluid Milk Processor Promotion Board.

Podcast 

In July 2020, O'Hara launched a podcast with sports website Just Women's Sports. The podcast was rebranded as The Players' Pod in April 2022. Website founder Haley Rosen had asked O'Hara to join the advisory board. O'Hara said that she instead asked to host their podcast because she'd "always thought hosting a podcast would be fun." O'Hara says her goal is to generate "open, candid conversations" about the lives of athletes, particularly female athletes.

Personal life 
O'Hara was one of many out LGBT athletes to compete in the 2019 FIFA Women's World Cup in France. As of 2019, during her off-season, she resides with her partner, Kameryn Stanhouse, in Washington, D.C. She got engaged to Stanhouse on New Year's Eve 2022.

Honors 
FC Gold Pride
WPS Championship: 2010
United States U20
 CONCACAF Women's U-20 Championship runner-up: 2008

United States
 FIFA Women's World Cup: 2015, 2019, runner-up: 2011
 Olympic Gold Medal: 2012
 Olympic Bronze Medal: 2020
 CONCACAF Women's Championship: 2014; 2018;  2022
 CONCACAF Women's Olympic Qualifying Tournament: 2012; 2016; 2020
 SheBelieves Cup: 2016; 2018; 2020, 2021; 2022
 Algarve Cup: 2011, 2013, 2015
 Four Nations Tournament: 2011
Individual
Pac-10 Conference First-Team: 2006, 2007, 2009
U.S. Soccer Young Female Athlete of the Year Finalist: 2007, 2009
Hermann Trophy Winner: 2009
NCAA All-American First-Team: 2009
ESPN Academic All-America First-Team: 2009
Georgia Sports Hall of Fame: Inducted February 22, 2020. O'Hara was the youngest person ever inducted and first soccer player to be inducted.
IFFHS CONCACAF Woman Team of the Decade 2011–2020
FIFPro Women's World XI: 2019

See also 

 List of Olympic medalists in football
 List of Stanford University people
 CONCACAF Women's U-20 Championship
 Soccer America Player of the Year Award
 Honda Sports Award

References 

Match report

Further reading 
 Grainey, Timothy (2012), Beyond Bend It Like Beckham: The Global Phenomenon of Women's Soccer, University of Nebraska Press, 
 Killion, Ann (2018), Champions of Women's Soccer, Penguin, 
 Lisi, Clemente A. (2010), The U.S. Women's Soccer Team: An American Success Story, Scarecrow Press, 
 Lloyd, Carli and Wayne Coffey (2016), When Nobody was Watching: My Hard-fought Journey to the Top of the Soccer World, Houghton Mifflin Harcourt, 
 Murray, Caitlin (2019), The National Team: The Inside Story of the Women Who Changed Soccer, Abrams, 
 Stevens, Dakota (2011), A Look at the Women's Professional Soccer Including the Soccer Associations, Teams, Players, Awards, and More, BiblioBazaar,

External links 

 Kelley O'Hara profile at National Women's Soccer League
 Kelley O'Hara profile at Washington Spirit
 
 
 
 
 
 Just Women's Sports podcast (host)

1988 births
2011 FIFA Women's World Cup players
2015 FIFA Women's World Cup players
2019 FIFA Women's World Cup players
American people of Irish descent
American women's soccer players
Boston Breakers players
FC Gold Pride players
FIFA Century Club
FIFA Women's World Cup-winning players
Footballers at the 2007 Pan American Games
Footballers at the 2012 Summer Olympics
Footballers at the 2016 Summer Olympics
Footballers at the 2020 Summer Olympics
Hermann Trophy women's winners
LGBT association football players
LGBT people from Georgia (U.S. state)
American LGBT sportspeople
Lesbian sportswomen
Living people
Medalists at the 2012 Summer Olympics
National Women's Soccer League players
Olympic gold medalists for the United States in soccer
Pali Blues players
Pan American Games medalists in football
Pan American Games silver medalists for the United States
People from Fayetteville, Georgia
NJ/NY Gotham FC players
Sportspeople from the Atlanta metropolitan area
Soccer players from Georgia (U.S. state)
Stanford Cardinal women's soccer players
United States women's international soccer players
United States women's under-20 international soccer players
USL W-League (1995–2015) players
Utah Royals FC players
Women's association football forwards
Women's association football midfielders
Medalists at the 2007 Pan American Games
Olympic bronze medalists for the United States in soccer
Medalists at the 2020 Summer Olympics
Women's Professional Soccer players
Washington Spirit players